Pursuant to Article 52 of the Law on Internal Regulations of the Islamic Consultative Assembly (Parliament of the Islamic Republic of Iran), the Health and Medical Commission of the Islamic Consultative Assembly is formed to perform the assigned duties in the field of health, treatment, relief, welfare, social security, social insurance and the Red Crescent affairs in the country in accordance with the provisions of the regulation.

Some of the responsibilities of this commission are:

 Examining the budget situation of the Ministry of Health and Medical
 Supervising the country's medical system and reviewing related plans and bills
 Supervising the country's pharmaceutical system and reviewing related plans and bills
 Supervising the country's health insurance system and reviewing related plans and bills
 Supervising the country's relief system and reviewing related plans and bills
 Supervision of bills and laws related to the health system of the country
 Pursue the demands of the parliament from the health system of the country

Members 
The members of the Health and Medical Commission of the Islamic Consultative Assembly in the second year of the 11th term of the Assembly are as follows:

See also 
 Program, Budget and Accounting Commission of the Islamic Consultative Assembly
 Education, Research and Technology Commission of the Islamic Consultative Assembly
 Social Commission of the Islamic Consultative Assembly
 Internal Affairs of the Country and Councils Commission of the Islamic Consultative Assembly
 Joint Commission of the Islamic Consultative Assembly
 Special Commission of the Islamic Consultative Assembly
 The history of the parliament in Iran

References

Committees of the Iranian Parliament
Islamic Consultative Assembly